Justice of Appeal can refer to:

Justice of Appeal (Fiji), a judge of Fiji's Court of Appeal or Supreme Court
Justice of Appeal (Hong Kong), a judge of the Court of Appeal of the High Court of Hong Kong